Mary Anderson is the name of:

Arts and entertainment 

 Mary Anderson (actress, born 1859) (1859–1940), American stage actress
 Mary Anderson (actress, born 1897) (1897–1986), American silent film actress
 Mary Anderson (actress, born 1918) (1918–2014), American film actress
 Mary Anderson (author) (born 1939), American young adult author
 Mary Anderson Lucas (1882–1952), English composer

Science, academia and medicine 

Mary Adamson Anderson Marshall (1837–1910), Scottish physician
Mary Anderson (gynaecologist) (1932–2006), Scottish gynaecologist
Mary Anderson (inventor) (1869–1953), inventor of the windshield wiper blade
Mary Annette Anderson (1871–1922), American professor, first black woman elected to Phi Beta Kappa
Mary P. Anderson (born 1953), American hydrologist and geologist

Other 

Mary Anderson (labor leader) (1872–1964), American labor activist and advocate for women in the workplace
Mary Anderson (New Zealand politician) (1887–1966)
Mary Anderson (British Army officer) (1916–2006)
Mary Anderson (figure skater) (born 1926), American figure skater
Mary (Gaiser) Anderson, co-founder of REI
Mary Anderson (decedent), (died 1996) unidentified decedent

Fictional characters
 Mary Anderson (Days of Our Lives), a character on the television soap opera Days of Our Lives

See also
 Mary Anderson Bain (1911–2006), American politician from Illinois
 Mary Anderson (yacht), a 1933 historic yacht
 Marie Anderson (1916–1996), American newspaper editor